Jon O. Gordon (born January 20, 1971) is an American author and speaker on the topics of leadership, culture, sales, and teamwork.

Gordon has worked with numerous athletic organizations, academic institutions, and corporations, including the Los Angeles Dodgers, Pittsburgh Pirates, San Diego Padres, Miami Heat, Oklahoma City Thunder, the University of Georgia's Bulldogs, Clemson University Tigers, University of Nebraska Athletic Department, Jacksonville Jaguars, Philadelphia Eagles, San Francisco 49ers, the Atlanta Falcons, Campell Soup, Wells Fargo, Northwestern Mutual, Publix, Southwest Airlines, Bayer, West Point Academy, and more. He works frequently with K-12 educators and administrators in school associations and districts across North America.

Gordon's training program called "The Energy Bus Animated Training Program" was released in 2015 and is an interactive course based on Gordon's bestselling book, The Energy Bus. In 2016, Gordon launched Positive University, an ongoing online program that provides access to content focused on overcoming everyday challenges, bringing together a community of like-minded people.

Gordon's work has been featured in The Washington Post, U.S. News & World Report, The Wall Street Journal, and New York Post, among others.

He holds a Bachelor of Science in human ecology from Cornell University and a Master of Arts in teaching from Emory University.

Books

Gordon wrote several books including The Wall Street Journal best-sellers The Energy Bus, ; The Carpenter ; The Power of Positive Leadership , The Power of a Positive Team , and You Win in the Locker Room First, which he co-authored with former Head Coach of the Atlanta Falcons, Mike Smith, and The Washington Post best-seller Training Campm . Other books include The No Complaining Rule, ; The Shark and the Goldfish, ;  Soup: A Recipe to Nourish Your Team and Culture  , The Seed; The Positive Dog, ; The Energy Bus for Kids, ; One Word, ; The Hard Hat, ; Thank You and Good Night, ; Life Word, ; The Energy Bus Field Guide ; and One Word for Kids, .

Sam Presti, general manager of the Oklahoma City Thunder (then Seattle SuperSonics), was quoted in The New York Times saying that Gordon's The Energy Bus is "a management book that shows readers how they can affect situations by how they frame them."

Ken Blanchard, co-author of The One Minute Manager, wrote in his foreword to The Energy Bus, "If you want to fuel your family, your career, your team, and your organization with spirit, read this book. Jon’s energy and advice will leap off the page and help you cultivate positive energy in everything you do—and you will make the world a better place for your having been here."

Speaking
Gordon has delivered keynote addresses and speeches at conferences and organizations across North America, including the World Leaders Conference, United States Automobile Association, Mass Mutual, Northwestern Mutual, New York Life, SC Johnson, San Francisco 49ers, Philadelphia Eagles, Atlanta Falcons, Los Angeles Dodgers, San Diego Padres, Pittsburgh Pirates, Los Angeles Clippers, Oklahoma City Thunder, Miami Heat, Clemson University Tigers, University of Nebraska Athletic Department, West Point Academy, FTD, Raymond James, Wells Fargo, BB&T, Southwest Air, SERVPRO, What a Burger, STAFDA, The University of Maryland Men's lacrosse team, and Five Guys.

Bibliography

References

External links
 Official site

Living people
American businesspeople
American self-help writers
American business writers
Cornell University alumni
1971 births